The Millersburg Glass Company was started in 1908 by John W Fenton in Millersburg, OH.

History
In early 1908 John W. Fenton left the Fenton Art Glass Company after a falling out with his brother Frank Fenton. Though he remained on the Fenton board of directors. He had helped found Fenton Art Glass with his brother in 1905 . 
The Millersburg factory was located in Millersburg, OH and was constructed quickly. The factory was state of the art for its day and opened in 1909. John was not the best businessman, he was more of a promoter. The factory was in an obscure location and the company folded in 1911. The company was sold to Samuel Fair and was reopened as the Radium Glass Company. This company only lasted one year and closed in 1912.

Colors
The company is well known for its Carnival glass. Its first carnival color was Radium. It is known for its bright and shiny finish. The main colors made by Millerburg are green, amethyst, and marigold. They also made vaseline, blue, lavender, and aqua.

Patterns
Millersburg often would develop patterns from those that they had made before. They also used different patterns on the inside and outside of a piece.

References 

Defunct glassmaking companies